Eker is an area in Bahrain, located near the villages of Nuwaidrat, Ma'ameer and the island of Sitra.

It is divided into 2 regions: East Eker and West Eker, with Shias making up the majority of the former's population.

References

Populated places in Bahrain